Kevin Mitchell (born 29 October 1984) is a British former professional boxer who competed from 2003 to 2015. He challenged twice for lightweight world championships; the WBO title in 2012; and the WBC title in 2015. At regional level, he held the Commonwealth super featherweight title from 2006 to 2008 and the British super featherweight title in 2008.

Amateur career
As an amateur, Mitchell won the senior-level ABA featherweight title in 2003, at the age of 18.

Professional career
Mitchell made his professional debut for promoter Frank Warren on 17 July 2003, scoring a first-round knockout of Stevie Quinn. On 10 December 2005, Mitchell stopped Mohammed Medjadji in six rounds to win the vacant IBF Inter-Continental super-featherweight title, his first regional championship.

Commonwealth and British super-featherweight champion
On 28 October 2006, Mitchell defeated George Ashie by twelve-round unanimous decision to win the vacant Commonwealth super-featherweight title. Two defences of this title came against Harry Ramogoadi on 10 March 2007 (sixth-round TKO) and Carl Johanneson on 8 March 2008 (ninth-round TKO). In the Johanneson fight, Mitchell also won the British super-featherweight title, but it would be prove to a very tough outing for him, as Johanneson had managed to draw level on the judges' scorecards by the time of the stoppage.

Moving up to lightweight
In 2009, Mitchell began his campaign at lightweight with the aim of winning a world title. Wins over Lanquaye Wilson on 22 May (third-round TKO) and Ruddy Encarnacion on 18 July (eighth-round TKO) served as a prelude to what would be one of Mitchell's most acclaimed performances to date, against Breidis Prescott on 5 December. Prescott, notorious for his punching power and shocking knockout of Amir Khan in 2008, had virtually no answer for Mitchell's skilful use of range, movement and accurate punches. At the end of the twelve-round distance, the judges scored the fight as a wide unanimous decision for Mitchell, handing him his 31st consecutive professional victory and the WBO Inter-Continental lightweight title.

First defeat
With the win over Prescott inching Mitchell ever closer to a world title opportunity, one final hurdle awaited him on 15 May 2010 at Boleyn Ground stadium, which took place in front of 15,000 fans. On the line was the WBO interim title, held by hard-hitting slugger Michael Katsidis, as well as a chance to fight for a full world title later in the year. At the opening bell, Mitchell looked to establish his jab and keep Katsidis at bay. In the first two evenly split rounds, the occasional flurry of hooks from a highly aggressive Katsidis was enough to make Mitchell fight consistently on the back foot in an attempt to keep out of range. However, in the closing seconds of both rounds, Katsidis was able to launch a charging attack and finish strongly at the bell. In the third round, Katsidis continued to charge at Mitchell and was soon able to land a combination of hooks which made Mitchell stumble backwards on unsteady legs. From thereon, Mitchell was unable to fully regain his composure and, less than two minutes later, he was buckled by a hard left hook and a further succession of unanswered punches, at which point the referee stopped the fight.

Personal struggles and comeback
Mitchell would not fight for more than a year, during which a series of personal problems came to light. Going into the Katsidis fight, Mitchell later revealed that he was going through family and relationship issues, as well as living an unhealthy lifestyle. A showdown against fellow lightweight prospect and domestic rival John Murray, then undefeated as a professional, was set for 16 July 2011 as a risky comeback fight for Mitchell. In an action-packed fight featuring several shifts in momentum, Mitchell was able to withstand Murray's aggressive onslaught and score an eighth-round stoppage to capture his second WBO Inter-Continental lightweight title.

World title challenges
Another year of relative inactivity followed until 22 September 2012, when Mitchell faced WBO lightweight champion Ricky Burns for his first world title opportunity. In front of his home crowd in Glasgow, Burns scored two knockdowns and defeated Mitchell in four rounds. Following his second professional loss, Mitchell spent ten months away from the sport. From 2013 to 2014, having switched promoters to Matchroom Sport and reunited with former trainer Tony Sims, Mitchell racked up four wins in what proved to be a steady return to form, coupled with a more mature and disciplined lifestyle.

On 31 May 2014, an unexpectedly stiff test came in the form of Ghislain Maduma, on the undercard to the rematch between Carl Froch and George Groves at Wembley Stadium. Since the fight was an eliminator to face then-reigning IBF lightweight champion Miguel Vázquez, Mitchell had forfeited his chance at fighting for the title even if he won. In the fight against Maduma, Mitchell gave up an early lead on points and absorbed many clean punches from his highly aggressive opponent. In the ninth round, and behind on all scorecards, Mitchell began to gain ground by catching Maduma with clean punches of his own. This was followed up in rounds ten and eleven, when Maduma was staggered by a series of punches and stopped on his feet.

With the IBF title opportunity gone astray, Mitchell went a different route in 2015. On 31 January, he faced Daniel Estrada for the vacant WBC Silver lightweight title. In what was described as a career-best performance, Mitchell showcased his boxing skills with renewed motivation en route to stopping Estrada in eight rounds. This set up a second world title opportunity for Mitchell, this time against WBC lightweight champion Jorge Linares. Their fight took place on 30 May and got off to a cagey start, with neither fighter winning any rounds convincingly. In round five, Mitchell scored a hard knockdown, allowing him to build up a lead on the scorecards and box with increasing confidence. However, Linares scored a knockdown of his own in round ten, which quickly signalled the end of the fight as Mitchell's eye had been badly cut from a punch, forcing the referee to wave off the fight.

The year ended on a sour note for Mitchell on 12 December, as he made another attempt at vying for a world title on the undercard of Anthony Joshua vs. Dillian Whyte. On the line was the WBA interim lightweight title, and facing him was Ismael Barroso, a then-unknown power puncher who came in with a near-perfect knockout record. From the opening round, Mitchell was unable to fend off the undefeated southpaw, who knocked him down three times. By the fifth round, the referee spared Mitchell from further damage and stopped the fight. Immediately afterwards, Mitchell had to be given oxygen by ringside doctors.

Retirement
Mitchell was scheduled to face European lightweight champion Edis Tatli on 18 March 2016 in Finland, but on 10 February, Mitchell announced his retirement and withdrawal from the fight. He told Sky Sports, "I've had a good think about it over the last week and I'm happily retired now. ... I've been doing this 22 years and it's time to call it a day and start a new chapter in my life."

Professional boxing record

References

External links

 at Matchroom Sport (archived)

1984 births
Living people
People from Romford
Boxers from Greater London
Super-featherweight boxers
Lightweight boxers
English male boxers
England Boxing champions
Featherweight boxers
Commonwealth Boxing Council champions
British Boxing Board of Control champions